A by-election was held for the New South Wales Legislative Assembly electorate of Camden on 15 August 1861 because John Douglas resigned as he was intending to move to Queensland.

Dates

Polling places

Results

John Douglas resigned.

See also
Electoral results for the district of Camden
List of New South Wales state by-elections

References

1861 elections in Australia
New South Wales state by-elections
1860s in New South Wales